Koninklijke Beerschot Voetbal en Atletiek Club, now K Beerschot VA was a Belgian football club from Antwerp.  The club was founded in 1899 when most players of Antwerp left the club. It played in the 1920 Olympic Games Stadium named the "Kiel".

After many financial problems over the years, the club was forced to retire from competition and was dissolved in 1999. Shortly after, K.F.C. Germinal Ekeren moved from Ekeren in the north of Antwerp to the south in order to install at the "Kiel". The club changed its name and became Germinal Beerschot, before the name was changed again in 2011 to Beerschot AC. In 2013, Beerschot AC went bankrupt and dissolved. A new team emerged: K Beerschot VA.

Honours 
Belgian First Division
Champions (7): 1921–22, 1923–24, 1924–25, 1925–26, 1927–28, 1937–38, 1938–39
Runners-up (7): 1900–01, 1922–23, 1926–27, 1928–29, 1936–37, 1941–42, 1942–43
Belgian Second Division
Winners: 1906–07
Runners-up: 1981–82, 1992–93, 1994–95
Belgian Second Division Final Round
Winners: 1982
Belgian Cup
Winners: 1970–71, 1978–79
Runners-up: 1967–68

European cup history

Notable players
  Pierre Braine
  Raymond Braine
  Kenneth Brylle
  Arthur Ceuleers
  Philippe Clement
  Julien Cools
  Rik Coppens
  Bob Dalving
  Alfons De Winter
  Lothar Emmerich
  Wim Hofkens
  Constant Huysmans
  Juan Lozano
  Jari Rantanen
  Emmanuel Sanon
  Gérard Sulon
  Simon Tahamata
  Guy Thys
  Arto Tolsa
  Jan Tomaszewski
  John Van Alphen
  Jack Van den Eynde
  Stanley Van den Eynde
  Jan Verheyen
  Patrick Vervoort
  Jef Vliers
  Andrey Zhelyazkov

External links 
 Pluto website – Belgian football clubs history
 RSSSF archive – 1st and 2nd division final tables

 
Defunct football clubs in Belgium
Football clubs in Antwerp
Association football clubs established in 1899
Association football clubs disestablished in 1999
1899 establishments in Belgium
1999 disestablishments in Belgium
Organisations based in Belgium with royal patronage
Belgian Pro League clubs